Katerina Dalaka (born August 20, 1992, in Munich, Germany) is a Greek hurdler. With origins from Katerini, currently representing A.E.K., Dalaka has won gold medals at the Panhellenic Games and the Balkan Games in 400 m hurdles as well as in 100 m, 200 m, the 100 m relay and the 400 m relay.

International competitions

Greek Championships 

2014 Panhellenic Games 
400 m hurdles: 59.61 s - 1st

2015 Panhellenic Games 
400 m hurdles: 59.34 s - 2nd

2016 Panhellenic Games 
200 m indoor: 24.83 s - 3rd 
100 m: 11.70 s - 1st 
400 m hurdles: 58.43 s - 1st

2017 Panhellenic Games 
60 m indoor: 7.50 s - 5th 
200 m indoor: 24.57 s - 2nd 
100 m: 11.57 s - 3rd 
400 m hurdles: 59.47 s - 1st

2019 Panhellenic Games 
4×400 m relay indoor: 3:46.69 - 1st 
100 m: 12.17 s - 8th 
4x400 m relay: 3:42.06 - 1st

2021 Panhellenic Games 
100 m: 11.59 s - 2nd 
200 m: 23.74 s (PB) - 2nd

References

External links 

1992 births
Living people
Greek female hurdlers
Greek female sprinters
Sportspeople from Katerini
Survivor Greece contestants
Survivor Turkey contestants